Winning Lines is an American game show that aired from January 8, 2000, to February 18, 2000, the day after its official cancellation. Adapted from the British format of the same name created by David Briggs, Mike Whitehill and Steven Knight, it was considered as CBS's answer to the success of ABC's  Who Wants to Be a Millionaire. Winning Lines was hosted by Dick Clark, directed by James Yukich and produced by Stone Stanley Entertainment in conjunction with the British production company, Celador. The announcer for the program was Chuck Riley.

Round 1
Forty-nine contestants took part; each was assigned a two-digit number from 01 to 49. Clark asked a series of mathematical questions, each with a numerical answer, and the contestants had five seconds to enter their answers on numerical keypads. For each question, the contestant who entered the correct answer in the shortest time advanced to the next round. The round ended after six contestants had advanced, and the other 43 were eliminated with no winnings.

Round 2: Sudden Death
As in the British version, each contestant carried their number from Round 1 with them into Round 2. Clark asked a series of mathematical questions, each of which could be answered with the number belonging to one of the contestants still in play at the time. If a contestant buzzed in and correctly answered with an opponent's number, that opponent was eliminated; a contestant who correctly responded with his/her own number remained in the game. An incorrect answer eliminated the contestant who gave it, regardless of the number. If no one buzzed in on a question, Clark revealed the correct answer and the contestant with that number was eliminated. The last remaining contestant won $2,500 and advanced to the bonus round, while the other five each received $1,000.

Bonus Round: The Wonderwall

The winner had three minutes to answer as many questions as possible, using 49 answers numbered 01–49 as displayed on three projection screens. Each correct answer earned more money, with 20 correct answers earning $1 million.

Seated in front of the Wonderwall, the contestant was given 15 seconds to study the answers before the round began. As in the British version, the contestant had to call out both the correct answer and its number to be given credit. The contestant could also freeze the timer twice for 15 seconds each (called "pit stops") and look over the board again; however, he/she was not allowed to answer during the pit stop. The contestant could also pass on a maximum of two questions. The correct answer was announced and removed from the board when the contestant responded (whether correct or incorrect), but not if he/she passed.

Giving an incorrect answer or failing to answer or pass within 15 seconds gave the contestant a strike. A button near the contestant's seat glowed red once either two strikes had been earned or there were 15 seconds left in the round, whichever came first. He/she could press this button at any time from that point to "bail out," ending the round and keeping all money earned to that point. If the contestant ran out of time or accumulated three strikes without bailing out, he/she lost all winnings from the Wonderwall and left with only the $2,500 won in the main game.

As in the British version, instead of the three screens in the studio, home viewers were shown a screen that continually scrolled from side to side and automatically jumped to the right place when a correct answer was given (either by the player or by the host in the event the player was incorrect).

The U.S. version offered an at-home game similar to the UK version. The second digit from each of the Round 1 winners' numbers and the second digit from the number of the final correct answer given during the Wonderwall were shown at the end of the show. Home viewers who could make up their own home or cell phone number from these digits, without the area code, were eligible to enter a drawing for $50,000.

References

External links 
 

CBS original programming
2000s American game shows
2000 American television series debuts
2000 American television series endings
Television series by Stone Stanley Entertainment
English-language television shows
American television series based on British television series